Roberto Rey (15 February 1905 – 30 May 1972) was a Chilean film actor who worked in Spain, appearing in more than fifty films during his career including the 1935 musical Paloma Fair.

Selected filmography
 A Lucky Man (1930)
 A Gentleman in Tails (1931)
 Transit Camp (1932)
 Paloma Fair (1935)
 The Dancer and the Worker (1936)
 The Barber of Seville (1938)
 It Always Ends That Way (1939)
 A Palace for Sale (1942)
 The Princess of the Ursines (1947)
 Bella the Savage (1953)
 They Fired with Their Lives (1959)
 Litri and His Shadow (1960)
 A Girl from Chicago (1960)
 The Daughters of Helena (1963)
 Gunfighters of Casa Grande (1964)
 Aragonese Nobility (1965)
 The Complete Idiot (1970)

References

Bibliography 
 D'Lugo, Marvin. Guide to the Cinema of Spain. Greenwood Publishing, 1997.

External links 
 

1905 births
1972 deaths
Chilean male film actors
20th-century Chilean male actors
Chilean emigrants to Spain